General elections were held in Uruguay on 26 October 2014, alongside a constitutional referendum. As no presidential candidate received an absolute majority in the first round of voting, a runoff took place on 30 November. Primary elections to determine each party's presidential candidate had been held on 1 June.

Incumbent President José Mujica was ineligible to run owing to a constitutional limit on serving consecutive terms. The governing Broad Front nominated Mujica's predecessor, Tabaré Vázquez, as its candidate. Vázquez came within a few thousand votes of a first-round victory and advanced to the runoff with National Party candidate Luis Alberto Lacalle Pou, son of former president Luis Alberto Lacalle de Herrera. In the runoff, Vázquez was returned to office with the widest margin since the run-off system was first implemented in 1999. The Broad Front also maintained its majority in the Chamber of Deputies, winning 50 of the 99 seats.

Electoral system
The president was elected using the two-round system, with a run-off required if no candidate received 50% of the vote in the first round. The 30 members of the Senate were elected by proportional representation in a single nationwide constituency. The 99 members of the Chamber of Representatives were elected by proportional representation in 19 multi-member constituencies based on the departments. Seats are allocated using the highest averages method.

The elections were held using the double simultaneous vote method, whereby voters cast a single vote for the party of their choice for the Presidency, the Senate and the Chamber of Representatives.

Candidates 
Presidential primaries were held on 1 June to select the candidates.

Campaign
There were around 250,000 new voters in this election, many of them not used to traditional media. Campaign managers and advertising agents took notice of this new trend, and implemented an important portion of their campaign via social media.

Opinion polls

Results
Within the Broad Front coalition, the Movement of Popular Participation won six seats in the Senate, the Liber Seregni Front won three and the Socialist Party won two. Following the second round of the presidential elections, the Broad Front gained an extra seat in the Senate, giving them a majority, as Vice President Raúl Fernando Sendic Rodríguez automatically became a member.

By department

References

External links
Electoral Process in Uruguay 2014-2015 Electoral Court of Uruguay 

Elections in Uruguay
Uruguay
General
Uruguay
Uruguay
Tabaré Vázquez